Rahul Mukerjee is an Indian academic and statistician. He is a National Science Chair of the Government of India, hosted by the Indian Institute of Management Calcutta, after his superannuation from the same institute in 2021 as a professor in the higher academic grade.

Biography
Mukerjee completed his BSc (Hons) and MSc degrees in Statistics at the University of Calcutta, with rank first in the first class in each case. He received his PhD in Statistics in 1982 from the University of Calcutta.

Career
After completing his education, Mukerjee taught briefly at University of Calcutta and then at the Indian Statistical Institute, where he was awarded an out-of-turn promotion to full professorship at the age of thirty three. He joined IIM Calcutta as a full professor in 1989. He has also held short- or long-term visiting positions in many institutions around the world, including Harvard University, Mathematical Sciences Research Institute, Berkeley, Rutgers University, University of Michigan, Pennsylvania State University, Georgia Institute of Technology, University of Georgia, University of Florida, University of Toronto, University of Waterloo, Simon Fraser University, Memorial University of Newfoundland, Hiroshima University, University of Hong Kong, Academia Sinica, Taipei, Nankai University, Seoul National University, National University of Singapore, University of Malaya, Kuwait University and University of São Paulo.

Mukerjee has been on the editorial boards of such major international journals as The Annals of Statistics, Biometrika, Journal of the Royal Statistical Society Series B, and Statistica Sinica.

Achievements
 Recipient, Indian Science Congress Association Young Scientists' Award, 1985.
 Honored Fellow, Institute of Mathematical Statistics, USA, 1999.
 Recipient, Shanti Swarup Bhatnagar Award, in mathematical sciences, 2000; highest award in science from Government of India.
 Recipient, National Award in Statistics in honour of C.R. Rao, 2001, Government of India.
 Fellow, Indian Academy of Sciences, 2001.
 Fellow, Indian National Science Academy, 2003.
 Fellow, National Academy of Sciences, India, 2003.
 Recipient, J.C. Bose National Fellowship, 2010–15 and 2015–20, Government of India.
 Platinum Jubilee Speaker, 2012, Indian Science Congress Association.
 Member, National Statistical Commission, 2013–16, Government of India.
 Independent Director (2017–20), Gas Authority of India Limited (GAIL), a Maharatna (highest level) company of Government of India. 
 Recipient, Mahalanobis International Award, 2017 International Statistical Institute.
 Recipient, P.V. Sukhatme National Award in Statistics, 2018, Government of India. 
 National Science Chair, 2021–24, Government of India.

Selected bibliography
Rahul Mukerjee has authored or co-authored 5 books and over 240 papers.

 "Randomized Response: Theory and Techniques" (1988, with A. Chaudhuri), Marcel Dekker.
 "A Calculus for Factorial Arrangements" (1989, with S. Gupta), Springer-Verlag.
 "Fractional Factorial Plans" (1999, with A. Dey), John Wiley & Sons.
 "Probability Matching Priors: Higher Order Asymptotics" (2004, with G.S. Datta), Springer-Verlag.
 "A Modern Theory of Factorial Design" (2006, with C.F. Jeff Wu), Springer-Verlag.

References

External links
Indian Institute of Management Calcutta – Faculty Information
Indian Institute of Management Calcutta – Operations Management Group Faculty
Indian Institute of Management Calcutta

1956 births
Living people
Fellows of the Institute of Mathematical Statistics
Fellows of the Indian Academy of Sciences
Academic staff of the Indian Institute of Management Calcutta
University of Calcutta alumni
Academic staff of the University of Calcutta
Recipients of the Shanti Swarup Bhatnagar Award in Mathematical Science
Indian statisticians